Cryptocodidae is a family of ctenophores belonging to the order Cydippida. The family consists of only one genus: Cryptocoda Leloup, 1938.

References

Tentaculata
Monogeneric animal families